J Spence was a professional rugby league footballer in the Australian competition, the New South Wales Rugby League. Spence played for the Eastern Suburbs club in the 1932 season.

References
 The Encyclopedia Of Rugby League Players, Alan Whiticker & Glen Hudson

Australian rugby league players
Sydney Roosters players
Year of birth missing
Year of death missing
Place of birth missing